Rescue Dawn is a 2006 American epic war drama film written and directed by Werner Herzog, based on an adapted screenplay written from his 1997 documentary film Little Dieter Needs to Fly. The film stars Christian Bale and is based on the true story of German-American pilot Dieter Dengler, who was shot down and captured by villagers sympathetic to the Pathet Lao during an American military campaign in the Vietnam War. Steve Zahn, Jeremy Davies, Pat Healy, and Toby Huss also have principal roles. The film project, which had initially come together during 2004, began shooting in Thailand in August 2005. Despite critical acclaim, the film was a box office failure.

Plot
In February 1966, while on a combat mission, Lt. Dieter Dengler, a German-born U.S. Navy pilot in squadron VA-145, flying from the carrier USS Ranger, is shot down in his Douglas A-1 Skyraider over Laos. He survives the crash, only to be captured by the Pathet Lao. Dengler is offered leniency by the province governor, if he will sign a document condemning America, but he refuses. Dengler is tortured and taken to a prison camp. There he meets his fellow prisoners: American pilots Gene DeBruin and Duane W. Martin, Hong Kong Chinese radio operator Y.C. To, Procet and Thai Air America freight employee Pisidhi Indradat, some of whom have been captives for years.

Dengler immediately plans to escape, but receives only grudging approval from the others. All are suffering from malnutrition, unhygienic conditions and abuse by the guards. After some months the food supply worsens further, and they learn that the starving guards are planning to kill them and return to their village, so the prisoners agree to put the long-prepared plan into action. This involves escaping through a weakened place in the perimeter fence, dividing into two groups, circling the perimeter fence in opposite directions, converging on the guard hut during the lunch hour to overwhelm the guards, and contacting the American forces for rescue.

Due to one party of prisoners disobeying Dengler's orders, the escape does not go according to the plan and nearly all the guards end up being shot. With insufficient equipment and supplies, the prisoners disperse in the jungle. Dengler and Martin form one group, while Gene and To leave together to an uncertain fate.

Dengler and Martin try to reach the Mekong River to cross over into Thailand, fashioning a crude raft, but are caught in rapids and a waterfall. After losing their raft, Dengler and Martin are soon found by a mob of angry villagers, who kill Martin. Dengler escapes and flees back into the jungle, hiding from the pursuing villagers. A few days later, he is rescued by an American helicopter. Back at the U.S. compound he is taken to, Dengler is kept isolated in a hospital for debriefing due to the classified nature of his mission. He is visited by some of the men from his squadron, who covertly take him back to his ship, where he is welcomed as a hero by the crew.

Cast

 Christian Bale as Lt. Dieter Dengler
 Zach Grenier as Squad Leader
 Marshall Bell as Admiral Berrington
 Toby Huss as Lt. Spook, Escadron Chief
 Pat Healy as Norman
 GQ as Farkas (as Gregory J. Qaiyum)
 James Aaron Oliver as Jet Pilot (as James Oliver)
 Brad Carr as U.S. Navy Pilot
 Saichia Wongwiroj as Pathet Lao Guard
 François Chau as Province Governor
 Teerawat Mulvilai as Little Hitler
 Yuttana Muenwaja as Crazy Horse
 Kriangsak Ming-olo as Jumbo
 Somkuan "Kuan" Siroon	as Nook the Rook
 Chorn Solyda as Walkie Talkie
 Steve Zahn as Lt. Duane Martin
 Jeremy Davies as Sergeant Gene DeBruin
 Galen Yuen as Y.C.
 Apichart Chusakul as Pisidhi Indradat  (as Abhijati "Muek" Jusakul)
 Lek Chaiyan Chunsuttiwat as Procet (as Chaiyan "Lek" Chunsuttiwat)
 Craig Gellis as Corporal Grunt

Production

Development

Rescue Dawn is based on the true story of Dieter Dengler, a charismatic pilot who was shot down in Laos while on a covert attack mission for the United States Navy during the Vietnam War. A few months after being captured in 1966, Dengler and other POWs who were being held captive targeted July 4 for their mass escape. The prisoners had overheard the guards in mid-June planning to kill all of them and return to their villages because a drought had caused a severe shortage of food and water. The POWs decided they could not wait any longer to make their escape.

Dengler and fellow POW Duane W. Martin made their eventual run from their prisoner camp into dense jungle. Martin was killed by an enraged Laotian villager, but Dengler was able to continue on. Two rescue helicopters were scrambled to rescue Dengler, dropping a cable down to the human figure they spotted below. They winched him on board, but fearful that he could be a Viet Cong suicide bomber, the crew pinned the man to the helicopter floor and searched him. His backpack turned out to contain only a half-eaten snake. Dengler, exhausted by his ordeal, whispered: "I am an American pilot. Please take me home."

Director Herzog's fascination with the cruelties of man and nature led his interest in the 1997 documentary Little Dieter Needs to Fly about Dengler's experiences in captivity. He chose to revisit the story in a cinematic theatrical version with Christian Bale portraying Dengler. Compared to Little Dieter Needs to Fly, Rescue Dawn understates the suffering of the prisoners, including omitting some of the worst torture experienced by Dengler. Herzog did not want to glorify the prisoners' woes, as the film is rated PG-13.

Filming
Principal photography took place over 44 days in Thailand. In preparation for the roles, the actors playing the prisoners spent several months losing weight. Since weight gain is accomplished more quickly than weight loss, the film was shot in reverse, with Bale fully regaining his weight during the course of the shoot. The film includes the first major use of digital visual effects in Herzog's career; the shots of Dengler's flight while airborne were created digitally. The crash itself, however, is live action.

Music and soundtrack
The original motion picture soundtrack for Rescue Dawn was released by the Milan Records label on June 26, 2007. It features classical music, with considerable use of the cello and piano. The score for the film was orchestrated by Klaus Badelt. Original songs written by musical artists Ernst Reijseger, Patty Hill, Craig Eastman, and Jack Shaindlin among others, were used in between dialogue shots throughout the film. Peter Austin edited the music.

Track listing:

Historical accuracy

The film depicts six prisoners in the camp, while in real life there were seven. Herzog says that he found the writing to be difficult with seven characters, and that six was a more manageable number.

Jerry DeBruin, brother of Gene DeBruin, created a website critical of Herzog and the film, claiming that several characters and events have been falsely portrayed. On the same website, Pisidhi Indradat, the other survivor of the group, has also stated that the film contains inaccuracies. The website claims that during his imprisonment, DeBruin taught his cellmates English, shared his food, and even returned after escaping to help an injured cellmate. In the film, Dengler formulates the entire escape plan, along with uncuffing the handcuffs with the nail. According to Jerry DeBruin, the prisoners waited for two weeks before telling him of the plan, which had been devised before his arrival.

Herzog acknowledged that DeBruin acted heroically during his imprisonment, refusing to leave while some sick prisoners remained. Herzog states he was unaware of this until after the film had been completed; however, Pisidhi Indradat and Jerry DeBruin stated they made multiple attempts to meet with Herzog to ensure the film's accuracy, but to no avail. Herzog states that this narrative aspect probably would have been included had he learned it earlier. In real life, Dengler spoke English with a heavy German accent which was reduced in Bale's portrayal "to almost zero".

Reception
Rescue Dawn was distributed by Metro-Goldwyn-Mayer theatrically in the United States, and by Pathé Distribution, Hopscotch Films and Central Film GmbH in foreign markets. It was originally scheduled to be released by MGM in December 2006, but was held back for limited release in the United States until 2007, with the full release on July 27 following a limited release in New York City, Toronto and Los Angeles on July 4. The film score was written by German composer Klaus Badelt, after previously working with Herzog in his 2001 film Invincible. The soundtrack was released on June 26, 2007.

Critical response
Preceding its theatrical run, Rescue Dawn was generally met with positive critical reviews before its initial screening in cinemas. Among mainstream critics in the United States, the film received almost exclusively positive reviews. , the film holds a 90% approval rating on Rotten Tomatoes, based on 163 sampled critics review gave the film a positive review, with an average score of 7.52 out of 10. Its consensus reads, "Director Werner Herzog has once again made a compelling tale of man versus nature, and Christian Bale completely immerses himself in the role of fighter pilot (and prisoner of war) Dieter Dengler." Metacritic gave the film a score of 77, indicating "generally favorable reviews".

Kirk Honeycutt, writing in The Hollywood Reporter, said actor Bale's performance was "most complex and compelling". He praised the director Herzog for his use of "lush jungle locations in Thailand, eloquent camera work and an unobtrusive but powerful music score" which brought to life the "story of a man in the wilderness battling the elements on his own terms".

Film critic Roger Ebert in the Chicago Sun-Times called Rescue Dawn, "perhaps the most believable [movie] that Herzog has made" while exclaiming, "There is nothing in it we cannot, or do not, believe. I was almost prepared to compare it to the classic storytelling of John Huston when I realized it had crucial Herzogian differences".

In the San Francisco Chronicle, Walter Addiego wrote that the film was "an old-fashioned prisoner-of-war movie that becomes much more because of writer-director Werner Herzog's admiration for the remarkable true story of its protagonist, Dieter Dengler". He thought the director "found an actor capable of conveying the Herzog-ian hero—wounded, a holy fool, a crackpot, a dreamer of outsized dreams—in everyone."

Scott Bowles of USA Today, said the film was "cold and unforgiving and chilling to behold". He declared, "War stories don't get much more harrowing or detached than Rescue Dawn, and that's both blessing and curse for the Werner Herzog film."

The film, however, was not without its detractors. Rick Groen of The Globe and Mail, felt that, "The strangely hybrid result, half Herzog and half Hollywood, plays like its own battleground. Sometimes, the tension is fascinatingly productive; other times, all we get is the worst of both worlds". Equally unimpressed was Paula Nechak of the Seattle Post-Intelligencer, who called Rescue Dawn "a noble effort that can't quite make itself unique in a saturated genre". She added, director Herzog "already has covered much of the tropical terrain of his long-delayed action film in his 1997 documentary Little Dieter Needs To Fly". Alternatively, J. Hoberman of The Village Voice, said the film "rivals Apocalypto as a jungle marathon, has all this and more". He also noted, "Bale even looks authentically starved (as in The Machinist). But seeing Dengler's adventure staged hardly seems more real than hearing his account—although, as conventionally framed and lit as it is, Rescue Dawn is the closest thing to a 'real' movie that Herzog has ever made."

Writing for The New York Times, Matt Zoller Seitz said the "story’s basis in fact doesn’t inoculate it against charges of predictability. Klaus Badelt’s score can be intrusively emphatic. And the triumphant ending—in which Dengler is welcomed back to his carrier with applause and speeches—is disappointingly conventional". Overall though, he did commend the film, stating, "'Rescue Dawn' is a marvel: a satisfying genre picture that challenges the viewer’s expectations".

James Berardinelli writing for ReelViews, called Rescue Dawn, "a solid effort from Herzog that fans of the genre should actively seek out" and noted that "Herzog understood when he made Little Dieter Needs to Fly that the ex-pilot's story would make an excellent feature. It's surprising it has taken him so long to make that movie." Berardinelli also commented that "Christian Bale continues to amaze with his ability and range. He may be the most versatile under-40 performer today. No role seems to be beyond him, and he has worked with some of the best directors of his era".

Describing some pitfalls, Elizabeth Weitzman of the NY Daily News said there was "an odd emotional disconnect leading up to the climactic escape, which can be traced directly to the performances". Weitzman, however, was quick to admit that "Herzog builds suspense from the start, and the movie is shot spectacularly." But ultimately, she was disappointed, saying, "There is a great movie in Werner Herzog's Vietnam saga, Rescue Dawn. Unfortunately, it's about 30 minutes too long. Although the rest of this based-on-truth adventure is woven with powerful moments, only toward the end will it hold you completely in its grip."

Ann Hornaday of The Washington Post, stated that Rescue Dawn was "an original addition to the war film canon. It's an instant classic of the form, a portrait of courage and sacrifice at their most stirring, but subversively resisting cant and cliche". She believed that "such a masterful depiction of American heroism and can-do spirit has been created by a German art film director known for considerably darker visions of obsession is an irony Herzog no doubt finds delicious". She also emphasized how "There's a sense of austerity underlying Rescue Dawn, all the more admirable for being so rare in Hollywood storytelling."

Similarly, David Ansen wrote in Newsweek that "Rescue Dawn is a Werner Herzog movie (and a true story), and though it's as taut and exciting as many edge-of-your-seat Hollywood escape movies, there's a mania about Dieter that sets him apart, a wild-eyed bravado that suggests the line between bravery and complete lunacy is a thin one."

Michael Phillips, in the Chicago Tribune, however, was not moved by the storytelling. He described his negativity saying "Rescue Dawn is Herzog's first English-language screenplay, and this is part of its problem: The hushed conversations between prisoners sound only fitfully idiomatic. Also – crucially – Herzog can't find a way to make his own big finish feel authentic, even if things did happen roughly this way." Critic Leonard Maltin though, wrote that Rescue Dawn was a "Gripping reworking of Herzog's 1997 documentary Little Dieter Needs to Fly". He praised the film, calling it an "edge-of-your-seat POW story".

At Metacritic, which assigns a weighted average out of 100 to critics' reviews, Rescue Dawn received a score of 77 based on 36 reviews. Various critics included the film on their lists for the top 10 best films of the year; such as V. A. Musetto of the New York Post, who called it one of the best films of 2007.

Accolades
Following its cinematic release in 2007, Rescue Dawn was nominated for multiple awards, including a Golden Satellite Award and an Independent Spirit Award.

Among other nominations, Rescue Dawn was considered for the Golden Satellite Awards in the categories of "Best Supporting Male", "Best Supporting Actor" and "Best Actor in a Drama". The film garnered a win for actor Christian Bale from the San Diego Film Critics Society in the category of "Body of Work".

Box office
Rescue Dawn grossed $5,490,423 in U.S. ticket receipts during a 17-week theatrical run and earned $1,686,720 outside the United States, for a total gross revenue of $7,177,143.  For 2007 as a whole, the film ranked 178th in box office performance. It was considered a financial failure due to its $10 million budget. The film did recoup its losses from $24,747,717 earned from DVD rentals and sales.

The film opened via limited release on July 4, 2007 in the United States. During its opening weekend, the film grossed $110,326 at six locations. Its official wide release was on July 24, 2007. Opening in a distant 11th place, the film earned $1,650,282, showing at 500 cinemas.

Rescue Dawns revenue dropped by 66% in its second week of release, earning $560,903 and falling to 18th place.

Home media
Following its cinematic release in theaters, the Region 1 Code widescreen edition of Rescue Dawn was released on DVD by MGM Home Entertainment in the United States on November 20, 2007. Special features for the DVD include: an audio commentary by Herzog and interviewer Norman Hill. Other extra include featurettes The Making of a True Story, Unfinished Business: Telling Dieter's Story, Strength of Character, War Stories and What Would Dieter Do? In addition, three deleted scenes with optional commentary by Herzog and Hill, and a still photo gallery are also included.

The widescreen hi-definition Blu-ray version was released at the same time. Special features include audio commentary by Herzog and Hill, deleted scenes with optional commentary by Herzog and Hill. Other extras include featurettes The Making of a True Story (multi-part documentary), Honoring the Brave (interactive memorial), Preparing for Survival, Before the Dawn Mission Secrets (trivia track), a photo gallery and the theatrical trailer in high definition format. According to the website The Numbers, estimates on DVD sales revenue in the United States totalled $24,747,717.

References

Bibliography

 Anton, Frank. Why Didn't You Get Me Out?: A POW's Nightmare in Vietnam. New York: St. Martin's Press, 2000. .
 Bailey, Lawrence. Solitary Survivor: The First American POW in Southeast Asia. Lincoln, Nebraska: Potomac Books, 2003. .
 Dengler, Dieter. Escape From Laos. New York: Presidio Press: 1997 .
 Henderson, Bruce. Hero Found: The Greatest POW Escape of the Vietnam War. New York: Harper, 2010. .
 Maltin, Leonard. Leonard Maltin's 2009 Movie Guide. New York: Signet, 2008. .
 Prager, Brad.The Cinema of Werner Herzog: Aesthetic Ecstasy and Truth. New York: Wallflower Press, 2007. .
 Rowe, James. Five Years to Freedom: The True Story of a Vietnam POW. New York: Presidio Press, 1984 .
 Wilms, Wilfried. Bombs Away! Representing the Air War over Europe and Japan. Amsterdam, The Netherlands: Rodopi, 2006. .

External links
 
 
 
 
 Interview with Werner Herzog @ Fresh Air, w/ Terry Gross - 07-25-07
 Rescue Dawn: The Truth
 Story Of Escape, Pisidhi Indradat

2006 films
2006 drama films
2000s war drama films
American aviation films
American epic films
American historical action films
American survival films
American war drama films
Lao-language films
Vietnamese-language films
American docudrama films
Films scored by Klaus Badelt
Films about prison escapes
Films about shot-down aviators
Films about the United States Air Force
Films about the United States Navy
Films directed by Werner Herzog
Films set in the 1960s
Films shot in Thailand
Historical epic films
Vietnam War prisoner of war films
War films based on actual events
2000s English-language films
2000s American films